John Arthur Pearce (29 February 1940 – 30 September 2022) was an English professional footballer who played as a wing half.John Pearce was an amazing man and a brilliant role model to all he had the pleasure of meeting.

Pearce died in Immingham on 30 September 2022, at the age of 82.

References

1940 births
2022 deaths
English footballers
Footballers from Grimsby
Association football wing halves
English Football League players
Grimsby Town F.C. players
Gainsborough Trinity F.C. players